Paul Gérin-Lajoie,  (February 23, 1920 – June 25, 2018) was a Canadian lawyer, philanthropist, and a former member of the National Assembly of Quebec and Cabinet Minister.

Early life
Born in Montreal, Quebec, the son of Henri Gérin-Lajoie and Pauline Dorion, he studied at Collège Jean-de-Brébeuf, where he was editor of the school paper, the Université de Montréal, and Oxford University as a Rhodes Scholar, where he received a Doctor of Laws degree. He was admitted to the Bar of Quebec in 1943.

Career
He ran unsuccessfully as a Liberal candidate in the riding of Vaudreuil-Soulanges in the 1956 general election and in a 1957 by-election. In 1958, he came in second at the Quebec Liberal Party leadership convention.

He was elected in Vaudreuil-Soulanges in the 1960 election and was re-elected in 1962 and 1966. From 1960 to 1964 he was the Minister of Youth in the cabinet of Jean Lesage (eventually serving as vice-premier) and in 1964 became the first person since 1875 to be appointed Minister of Education, serving in that position until 1966. As Minister of Education he was the driving force behind major changes made to Quebec's education system. He did not run for re-election in 1970.

Gérin-Lajoie was president of the Canadian International Development Agency from 1970 to 1977.

He founded the Paul Gérin-Lajoie Foundation, in 1977, an organization that has contributed to the basic education of children in the poorest countries in addition to raising awareness of these countries among primary school children in Canada.

Honours
In 1966, he received an honorary doctorate from Sir George Williams University, which later became Concordia University. In 1979, he was made a Companion of the Order of Canada "in recognition of his distinguished services to his country, chiefly as president of the Canadian International Development Agency from 1970 to 1977, and as deputy premier and minister of education of the Government of Québec from 1960 to 1966". In 1987, he was made an Officer of the National Order of Quebec and was promoted to Grand Officer in 1998. In 2002, he was made a Knight of the Order of the Legion of Honour by the Government of France.
There’s a high school, named in his honour, called École Secondaire Paul-Gérin-Lajoie-d’Outremont; located in the borough of Outremont, Montreal.

Electoral record

References

http://www.paul-gerin-lajoie-doutremont.ca/

External links
 
 Fondation Paul Gérin-Lajoie 

Paul Gerin-Lajoie
Lacoste family
1920 births
2018 deaths
Alumni of Pembroke College, Oxford
Canadian King's Counsel
Canadian Rhodes Scholars
Chevaliers of the Légion d'honneur
Companions of the Order of Canada
Deputy premiers of Quebec
French Quebecers
Grand Officers of the National Order of Quebec
Lawyers from Montreal
Philanthropists from Quebec
Politicians from Montreal
Quebec Liberal Party MNAs
20th-century philanthropists